John Bagot may refer to:

 John Bagot (cricketer) (1842–1901), British Guianese cricketer
 John Bagot (1849–1910), businessman and South Australian colonial politician 
 John Tuthill Bagot (1819–1870), lawyer and South Australian colonial politician